Bastelicaccia (Corsican: A Bastirgaccia) is a commune in the Corse-du-Sud department of France on the island of Corsica.

The inhabitants of the commune are known as Bastilcacci or Bastelicacciais and Bastelicacciaises.

Geography
It was created in 1865 between the rivers Gravona and Prunelli. The highest point in the commune is Monte Aragnasco. Access to the commune is by Route nationale N196 which passes through the south of the commune from the airport in the west to Cauro in the east. The D3 branches off the N196 at the south-western edge of the commune and goes north-east through the commune to Ocana. Access to the village is by the D303 which branches from the D3 in the commune and goes north to the village then continues north to join the D1 west of Cuttoli-Corticchiato. Apart from the main village there are the villages of Colombina, Macina, Bottacina, Cagile, Casaccia, Mascarone, Cuara, Funtanacciu, Mascardaccia, Suaralta, Forcala, and Pisciatello. The commune is hilly with many villages, farms, and some forests.

One of the traditional cheeses of Corsica is called bastelicacciu after the commune. It is produced in the lower valleys of the Gravona and Prunelli.

History
On the 18th century land survey Bastelicaccia was better known as Bastélica-Communes. It became populated from the beginning of the 19th century.

With a land area of 1820 hectares, the population of about 800 in Bastelica village considered that it was easier to settle in the plains for most farmers as the lowland climate was better in winter. So, in summer, there would be an annual migration back to Bastelica village. As a result, the Chief Surveyor advised the creation of the commune of Bastelicaccia.

Bastelicaccia is part of the Canton of Ajaccio-5. The Canton also includes Alata, Villanova and part of Ajaccio.

Bastelicaccia has evolved at a rapid pace due to the proximity of the regional capital and its urban sprawl.

Administration

List of Successive Mayors

Demography
In 2017 the commune had 3,983 inhabitants.

Culture and heritage

Civil heritage
The commune has a very large number of houses that are registered as historical monuments. As well as the houses the commune also has a number of other sites that are registered as historical monuments:
 A Bread Oven at Cagili (18th century)
 The Prunelli Inn at Pisciatella (19th century)
 The old Primary School at Fontanaccio (1882)
 The old Primary School at Pedocchio (1882)

Religious heritage
The Church of Saint Michel (19th century) is registered as an historical monument. The Church contains a Statue: Christ on the Cross (18th century) which is registered as an historical object.

See also
 Communes of the Corse-du-Sud department

References

Communes of Corse-du-Sud